Throb is an album by vibraphonist Gary Burton recorded in 1969 and released on the Atlantic label. Burton is featured with guitarist Jerry Hahn, violinist  Richard Greene, bassist Steve Swallow and drummer  Bill Goodwin.

Release and reception 
Originally released on vinyl in 1969, the album was paired with Gary Burton's collaboration album with Keith Jarrett on a Rhino CD reissue in 1994 before being re-issued in Japan on CD in 2012 and 2017. The Allmusic review by Ron Wynn stated: "Burton continued the jazz-cum-rock and country experimentation that marked other LPs like Tennessee Firebird and Duster". The Penguin Guide to Jazz Recordings describes the album as “magnificent”, and “one of the most evocative records produced at the time.”

Track listing
 "Henniger Flats" (David Pritchard) - 4:25
 "Turn of the Century" (Michael Gibbs) - 5:07
 "Chickens" (Steve Swallow) - 2:29
 "Arise, Her Eyes" (Swallow) - 3:51
 "Prime Time" (Jerry Hahn) - 4:07
 "Throb" (Gibbs) - 4:33
 "Doin the Pig" (Swallow) - 3:47
 "Triple Portrait" (Gibbs) - 4:28
 "Some Echoes" (Gibbs) - 6:59
Recorded at Atlantic Recording Studios in New York.

Personnel
Gary Burton — vibraphone, piano
Richard Greene — violin
Jerry Hahn — guitar
Steve Swallow — bass
Bill Goodwin — drums

References

Atlantic Records albums
Gary Burton albums
1969 albums
Albums produced by Joel Dorn